Han Ji-Ho (born December 15, 1988) is a South Korean football player who plays for Bucheon FC 1995 as a forward or winger.

Club career 
Han Ji-ho joined Busan IPark at the start of the 2010 K League season. He made his debut on 4 September 2010 as a substitute in a 1-1 draw with Incheon United, and his first start came the following month on 3 October in a 2-1 defeat to Daegu FC. Han scored his first goal for the club on 16 July 2011 in a 2-1 win over Sangju Sangmu.

After six years with Busan, Han joined Asan Mugunghwa in the K League 2 to complete his mandatory military service in 2016. In his first year with the military side, Han scored a career-best of ten league goals. At the completion of his service, Han returned to Busan for the final stages of the 2017 K League 2 season.

In 2019, Han was named by coach Cho Deok-je as the club captain. He was replaced as captain by veteran defender Kang Min-soo for the 2020 season.

Club career statistics

External links
 

1988 births
Living people
Association football forwards
South Korean footballers
Busan IPark players
Ansan Mugunghwa FC players
K League 1 players
K League 2 players